August Mencken (February 18, 1889 – May 19, 1967) was an American civil engineer and author. He was the younger brother of Henry Louis Mencken and the son of cigar magnate August Mencken Sr.

Bibliography
 First-class Passenger (1938)
 By the Neck: A Book of Hangings (1942)
 The Railroad Passenger Car: An Illustrated History of the First Hundred Years (1957)
 The Fair Chanteuse, or, Science is Here to Stay (1958)
 The Reluctant Bride: A Romance (1960)
 Designing and Building the Great Pyramid (1963)

1889 births
1967 deaths
20th-century American engineers
American people of German descent
American male non-fiction writers
20th-century American male writers